Michael John Romer Healy (26 November 1923 – 17 July 2016) was a British statistician known for his contributions to statistical computing, auxology, laboratory statistics and quality control, and methods for analysing longitudinal data, among other areas.  He was professor of medical statistics at the London School of Hygiene and Tropical Medicine from 1977 until his retirement. The Royal Statistical Society awarded him the Guy Medal in Silver in 1979 and Gold in 1999, and he also acted as chairman of its medical section. He was the author or co-author of three books and over 200 scientific papers.

He died on 17 July 2016 at the age of 92.

Books
 Assessment of Skeletal Maturity and Prediction of Adult Height (TW2Method) (with J. M. Tanner, R. H. Whitehouse, W. A. Marshall and H. Goldstein), Academic Press, London, 1975 (2nd edn, 1983, additionally with N. Cameron). 
 Matrices for Statistics, Oxford University Press, Oxford, 1986. 
 GLIM: an Introduction, Oxford University Press, Oxford, 1988.

References

1923 births
2016 deaths
British statisticians
Auxologists
Academics of the London School of Hygiene & Tropical Medicine
People from Paignton
Alumni of Trinity College, Cambridge